Katy Ward (born 5 January 1984) is an English footballer who plays as left-back. She currently plays for Coventry City.

Club career
Ward played for Wolves and Aston Villa before joining Birmingham City. In March 2004, she suffered torn ankle ligaments, a broken fibula and a cracked tibula early in Birmingham's FA Women's Cup semi-final defeat to Charlton Athletic Ladies.
She spent the 2005–06 season with Bristol Academy before returning to Birmingham City in the later part of the 2006 season. 
She left for Blackburn Rovers in July 2009 and scored on the opening day of the 2009–10 season in a 1–1 draw with Doncaster Rovers Belles.

International career
Ward has represented England at Under-16, 18 and 19 levels.

Personal life
Ward works as a teacher at Kings Heath Boys School in Birmingham.

Statistics

References

External links

Kate Ward at Coventry City Ladies FC

1984 births
Living people
English women's footballers
Aston Villa W.F.C. players
Bristol Academy W.F.C. players
Birmingham City W.F.C. players
Coventry United W.F.C. players
Blackburn Rovers L.F.C. players
FA Women's National League players
Women's association football defenders
Wolverhampton Wanderers W.F.C. players